Agartala - Udaipur Tripura Passenger is a passenger express train of the Indian Railways connecting Agartala in Tripura and  Udaipur Tripura in Tripura. It is currently being operated with 55683/55684 train numbers on six a day basis.

Service

The 55683/55684 has an average speed of 37 km/hr and covers the 43 km in 1 hrs 15 mins.

Route and halts

Traction

Both trains are hauled by a WDM-3A diesel locomotive based at the New Guwahati Locomotive Shed.

Coach composite

The train consists of 13 coaches:

 4 General
 1 Second-class Luggage/parcel van

Rake maintenance 

The train is maintained by the Silchar Coaching Depot. The same rake is used for Agartala - Udaipur Tripura Passenger for one way which is altered by the second rake on the other way.

See also 

 Agartala railway station
 Udaipur railway station
 Agartala - Udaipur Tripura Passenger

References

References 
 55683/Udaipur (Tripura) - Agartala Passenger
 55684/Agartala - Udaipur Tripura Passenger

Rail transport in Tripura
Transport in Agartala
Slow and fast passenger trains in India
Railway services introduced in 2017
2017 establishments in Tripura